Wicks may refer to:

Wicks (hairstyle)
Wicks (surname)
Wicks (TV series), a Canadian television series (1979-81)

See also
Wick (disambiguation)
Wickes (disambiguation)
Wix (disambiguation)